José Pliya (born April 17, 1966 in Cotonou) is an actor, stage director, and playwright from Benin. In 2003 he won the Young Writers' Award from the Académie française.

References

Beninese dramatists and playwrights
1966 births
Living people
People from Cotonou
Beninese male actors
21st-century male actors
20th-century male actors
20th-century dramatists and playwrights